Karthika Menon, better known by her stage name Bhavana, is an Indian actress who predominantly appears in Malayalam and Kannada films, and has also appeared in some Tamil and Telugu films. Bhavana made her acting debut with the Malayalam film Nammal in 2002.

Early life 
Bhavana was born as Karthika Menon in Thrissur, Kerala, as the daughter of Pushpa and assistant cinematographer G. Balachandran. She has an elder brother, Jayadev. She did her schooling at Holy Family Convent Girls High School, Thrissur.

Bhavana has described herself as a restless person and someone who's "hard to handle". She grew up with a dream to become an actress. As a five-year-old, she used to imitate actress Amala's scenes from the Malayalam film Ente Sooryaputhrikku in front of the mirror and was even willing to jump from a building and break her arm, like Amala's character, did in the film.

Career 
At age 16, she debuted in the Malayalam film Nammal taking the stage name Bhavana opposite newcomers Sidharth Bharathan, Jishnu and Renuka Menon. The film was a big success and she got several offers in Malayalam. She won many honors and received a Kerala State Special Jury Mention for the film. Bhavana was an 11th Standard student when she got her break in the film.

In 2010, she starred in her first Kannada film alongside Puneeth Rajkumar, Jackie which was a blockbuster. Following the film's huge success, the film was dubbed into Telugu and Malayalam. Bhavana was said to star with Emraan Hashmi and Amitabh Bachchan in a Bollywood film. Her second Kannada film Vishnuvardhana with Sudeep opened to a big response. She appeared in the Malayalam films Ozhimuri and Trivandrum Lodge in 2012, and Honey Bee and Ezhamathe Varavu in 2013. She played Roshni Mathew, a single mother employed in an IT company, in Shyamaprasad's Ivide, a crime thriller based on the serial killing of IT techies in major US cities.

In 2016, she starred in a film with Benedict Doray. Recent films of Bhavana include Swapnathekaal Sundaram and Adventures of Omanakuttan.

In 2022, it was announced Bhavana would return to making Malayalam movies, with Adhil Maimoonath Asharaf's debut feature Ntikkakkakkoru Premondaarnn.

Abduction and assault 
In February 2017, she was kidnapped while returning home from a shoot and subjected to sexual assault by a gang of men. In April 2017, there were multiple reports in the media that actor Dileep had links to the main accused. In July 2017, Dileep was arrested by the investigating team, which said in its charge sheet that there was circumstantial evidence for Dileep's alleged conspiracy with the other accused men. Dileep was released on bail in October 2017. In 2022, amid further media reports alleging Dileep's attempt to intimidate an investigating officer, new charges were filed against him and five others.

After the assault, Bhavana withdrew from the industry for five years. Bhavana made her first comment about the case in 2022.

Bhavana's assault partly contributed to the creation of the Malayalam film industry Women in Cinema Collective, formed to protect female actors. A couple of months after Bhavana spoke out, the Kerala state assembly is planning legislation to protect women working in the film industry.

Personal life 
The engagement ceremony of Bhavana and Kannada film producer Naveen was held in March 2017. They married on 22 January 2018.

Filmography

Awards

References

External links 
 

Living people
Kerala State Film Award winners
Indian film actresses
Actresses from Thrissur
Filmfare Awards South winners
21st-century Indian actresses
Actresses in Tamil cinema
Actresses in Telugu cinema
Actresses in Kannada cinema
Actresses in Malayalam cinema
Year of birth missing (living people)
Actresses in Malayalam theatre
Indian stage actresses
Women artists from Kerala